Norman Wanstall (born 1935) is a British retired sound editor who did the sound editing for a few of the early James Bond films. He won the first Oscar for a James Bond film at the 1964 Academy Awards. He won in the category of Best Sound Editing for the film Goldfinger.

In 2000 he appeared in some making-of features for the James Bond films.

References

External links

Recent interview

Best Sound Editing Academy Award winners
British sound editors
1935 births
Living people